State Road 230 (NM 230) is a  state highway in the US state of New Mexico. NM 230's southern terminus is at NM 150 in El Prado, north of Taos, passing through Valdez before reaching its northern terminus is at NM 150 in Arroyo Seco.

Major intersections

See also

References

230
Transportation in Taos County, New Mexico